Relic is a 2020 Australian  psychological horror film directed by Natalie Erika James from a screenplay by James and Christian White. The film stars Emily Mortimer, Robyn Nevin, and Bella Heathcote.

Relic had its world premiere at the Sundance Film Festival on 25 January 2020, and was released on 3 July 2020 in the United States by IFC Midnight, and 10 July in Australia on Stan.

Plot
When Edna, the demented, elderly, and widowed matriarch of the family, goes missing, her daughter Kay and granddaughter Sam travel to their remote family home to find her. They discover the house locked from the inside, and a strange black mold-like substance on an upstairs wall. Much of the furniture has been adorned with Post-it notes of reminders for Edna.

That night, Sam is visited by their young neighbour Jamie, who states that he had not been to visit Edna for a while after his father had told him not to go back to the house. Sam and Kay grow increasingly disturbed by a loud creaking from inside the walls and the appearance of more black mold throughout the house. Kay experiences nightmares of a withered rotting corpse in an old shack in the woodlands.

The next morning, Kay finds Edna has returned, barefoot and muddied, and unaware of her own disappearance. Following a visit from a doctor, Edna is found to be mostly of sound mind and without injury with the exception of a large black bruise on her chest (resembling the mold). Kay tells Sam that she plans to move Edna into a retirement home, given her self-neglect. That night, Kay awakes to find Edna sleepwalking toward the front door, whispering, "It's nothing." After being brought back to bed, Edna is convinced there is something hiding in the room and urges Kay to check under the bed; Kay sees something breathing but is distracted before she can investigate further.

The next day, Sam and her grandmother share a tender moment until Edna suddenly grows cold and accuses Sam of stealing from her. She snatches the ring off of Sam's finger (not remembering that she had gifted Sam this ring). Following another violent event involving Edna, Sam visits Jamie's father Alex to ask why he stopped letting Jamie visit. Alex reveals that the last time Jamie visited, the pair played hide-and-seek, however, Edna mistakenly locked Jamie in his hiding space and left him there for hours, forgetting she had even seen him that day. Back at the house, Kay follows Edna into the garden, where she finds her tearing pages from the family photo album and frantically eating them. When Kay tries to intervene, Edna bites her and storms off, attempting to bury the album in the soil, claiming it will "be safer there". Fearing something may come to get her, Edna softens and agrees to let Kay take care of her.

Sam discovers a hidden passageway to another part of the house. She enters but becomes lost as the corridor begins to loop. Disoriented and afraid, she resorts to screaming and banging on the walls. Edna's condition seems to have worsened again; she now glares at Kay mistrustfully, refusing to eat and wetting herself. Kay notices her mother's urine is stained black. As Edna bathes, she scratches what was once her bruise but is now rotting black flesh. The bathwater overflows and reacts with an electric heater, causing the house's power to go out. Sam travels deeper into the corridors. The ceilings slope lower, forcing her to crawl. She eventually escapes by knocking holes through the molded walls.

Kay finds Edna, much to her horror, picking at her rotting face with a knife. Kay and Sam flee into the passageway (hearing Edna approaching). Edna, now disfigured and physically contorted, crawls toward them. She attempts to pin down Sam before being beaten down by Kay. Wheezing, the decaying Edna gestures toward a post-it note on the floor, labelled "I AM LOVED", and smiles. Kay realises that the walls of the house are no longer rotting and returns to her corpse-like mother to carry her to bed. She helps Edna peel away the last remnants of her hair and flesh to reveal her final form, a withered rotting corpse (like the one in her nightmare). Kay and Sam then lay on the bed with Edna until she peacefully falls asleep.

The film ends with Sam noticing a very small black bruise on the nape of Kay's neck, resembling that of Edna's initial bruise, suggesting that in time Kay will suffer a similar fate as her mother.

Cast
 Emily Mortimer as Kay 
 Robyn Nevin as Edna
 Bella Heathcote as Sam
 Chris Bunton as Jamie
 Jeremy Stanford as Alex
 Steve Rodgers as Constable Mike Adler

Production
In October 2018, Emily Mortimer, Robyn Nevin and Bella Heathcote joined the cast of the film with Natalie Erika James directing from a screenplay she co-wrote alongside Christian White. Jake Gyllenhaal and Riva Marker served as producers on the film, while Anthony Russo and Joe Russo served as executive producers under their Nine Stories Productions and AGBO banners, respectively.

Release
The film had its world premiere at the Sundance Film Festival on 25 January 2020. On 10 March, it was announced that IFC Midnight had acquired the North American distribution rights to the film. In the United States, it was released on 3 July 2020 in drive-in theatres and received a wide release in theatres and video on demand on 10 July.

Reception

Box office 
Relic grossed $192,352 from 69 theaters in its opening weekend, finishing first among reported films. It then made $195,674 from 128 theaters in its second weekend.

Critical response 
The site's critics consensus reads, "Relic ratchets up its slowly building tension in an expertly crafted atmosphere of dread, adding up to an outstanding feature debut for director/co-writer Natalie Erika James." On Metacritic, the film has a weighted average score of 76 out of 100, based on 34 critics, indicating "generally favorable reviews."

Justin Chang, speaking on Fresh Air, said: "There are no shocking twists or contrivances in store in Relic, and not a lot of gore, either. James excels at mining dread and tension from ordinary conversation, and she uses thriller conventions to get at something simple but shattering: the horror of watching a parent slowly deteriorate."

Accolades

References

External links
 
 

2020 films
American horror drama films
Australian horror drama films
2020 independent films
IFC Films films
Stan (service) original films
2020s horror drama films
2020 horror films
2020 drama films
2020s psychological horror films
2020 directorial debut films
2020s English-language films
Screen Australia films
2020s American films
Films set in country houses